C. Roger Myers (February 12, 1906 – June 5, 1985) was a Canadian psychologist.

Early life and career
He was born in Calgary, Alberta on February 12, 1906. He was obtained a BSc (1927) followed by a MSc (1929) and then a PhD (1937) from the University of Toronto. He began teaching psychology there in 1931 and became a full professor in 1948. He was chair of the Department of Psychology from 1956 to 1968.

Myers was active in the Canadian Psychological Association being elected President in 1950. He died in Toronto in 1985.

Positions
 1950: President, Canadian Psychological Association

External links

References

1906 births
1985 deaths
Canadian psychologists
People from Calgary
Academic staff of the University of Toronto
20th-century psychologists
Presidents of the Canadian Psychological Association